The Gyeongsang dialects (also spelled Kyŏngsang), or Southeastern Korean, are dialects of the Korean language of the Yeongnam region, which includes both Gyeongsang provinces,
North and South. There are approximately 13,000,000 speakers. Unlike Standard Korean, most of the variants of the Gyeongsang dialects are tonal, which is similar to Middle Korean.

Gyeongsang dialects vary. A native speaker can distinguish the dialect of Daegu from that of the Busan-Ulsan area although the first city is less than 100 kilometers away from the latter two cities. Dialectal forms are relatively similar along the midstream of Nakdong River but are different near Busan and Ulsan, Jinju and Pohang as well as along the eastern slopes of Mount Jiri.

Vowels
Most Gyeongsang dialects have six vowels, a (ㅏ), e (ㅔ), i (ㅣ), eo (ㅓ), o (ㅗ), u (ㅜ). In most areas, the vowels ㅐ(ae) and ㅔ (e) are conflated, as are ㅡ(eu) and ㅓ(eo). W and y are generally dropped after a consonant, especially in South Gyeongsang dialects. For example, soegogi (쇠고기) 'beef' is pronounced sogogi (소고기), and gwaja (과자) 'confectionery' is pronounced ggaja (까자).

Vowels are fronted when the following syllable has a y or i, unless a coronal consonant intervenes. For example, eomi 'mother' is emi, and gogi 'meat' is gegi.

Consonants
Southern Gyeongsang (specifically, nearby Namhae) dialects lack the tense consonant ss (ㅆ). Thus, the speakers pronounce ssal (쌀), meaning "rice", as sal (살) meaning "flesh". Palatalization is widespread: gy-, gi, ki and ky- are pronounced j and ch, e.g. 귤 is jul and 기름 is jileum,  while hy- is pronounced s, e.g. 힘 is sim. Many words have tense consonants where the standard is tenuis. Middle Korean z and β are preserved as s and b, as in 새비 saebi for Standard Korean 새우 saeu "shrimp" or 가새 gasae for Standard Korean 가위 gawi "scissors".

Tone
Dialects are classified as North Gyeongsang or South Gyeongsang based on pitch accent. North Gyeongsang has high tone, low tone (short vowel), and high tone (long vowel), whereas South Gyeongsang has high, mid, and low tone. For example, South Gyeongsang distinguishes sóni 'guest', sōni 'hand', and sòni 'grandchild'. Pitch accent plays a grammatical role as well, for example distinguishing causative and passive as in jép-pida 'make s.o. catch' and jepída 'be caught'.

In North Gyeongsang, any syllable may have pitch accent in the form of a high tone, as may the two initial syllables. For example, in trisyllabic words, there are four possible tone patterns: 
메누리 ('daughter-in-law')
어무이 ('mother')
원어민 ('native speaker')
오래비 ('elder brother')

Grammar
The Gyeongsang dialect maintains a trace of Middle Korean: the grammar of the dialect distinguishes between a yes-no question and a wh-question, while Standard Modern Korean does not. With an informal speech level, for example, yes-no questions end with "-a (아)" and wh-questions end with "-o (오)" in the Gyeongsang dialect, whereas in standard speech both types of questions end in either "-ni (니)" or "-eo (어)" without a difference between the types of questions. For example:
 "밥 뭇나?" [Bap mún-na?] or "밥 묵읏나?" [Bap múgeut-na?] as opposed to "밥 먹었니?" [Bap meogeot-ní?] or "밥 먹었어?" [Bap meogeo-sséo?]    (casual greetings in Korean.)
  — "Did you have a meal?" or "Did you eat?" 
 "머 뭇노?" [Meo mun-no?] as opposed to "뭘 먹었니?" [Meol meogeot-ni?] or "뭘 먹었어?" [Meo meogeosseo?] 
  — "What did you eat?"

Notice that the first question can be answered with a yes or no, while the latter question requires detail explanation of the food eaten.

However, -no also works as a rhetorical question ending.
 "이거 와 이래 맛있노" [I-geo wa irae mat-itno.]
  - Literal meaning "Why is this so delicious?", actual meaning "This is so delicious."

This phenomenon can also be observed in tag questions, which are answered with a yes or no.
"Eopje, geújya?" (업제, 그쟈?) as opposed to "Eopji, geureotchí?" (없지, 그렇지?) 
  — "It isn't there, is it?"

Sociolinguistics

From the Park Chung-hee to the Kim Young-sam governments (1961–1997), the Gyeongsang dialect had greater prominence in the Korean media than other dialects as all of the presidents (except Choi Kyu-hah) were natives of Gyeongsang province. That is why some South Korean politicians or high-rank officials have been misunderstood for not trying to convert to the Seoul accent, which is considered standard in South Korea.

However, when former president Kim Young-sam was in office, his public speeches were the subject of much scrutiny and his pronunciation elicited both criticism and amusement. He once mistakenly pronounced '경제 (Gyeongje, 經濟: meaning 'economy')' as '갱제 (Gaengje: a Gyeongsang pronunciation of the older generation for '경제')' and '외무부 장관 (oemubu-janggwan, 外務部長官: meaning 'foreign minister')' as '애무부 장관 (aemubu-janggwan, 愛撫部長官: meaning 'making out minister')'. A humorous anecdote arose from another of his public speeches where audiences were said to have been surprised to hear that he would make Jeju a world-class 'rape' (관광, 觀光 [gwan gwang, tourism] > 강간, 強姦 [gang-gan, rape]) city by building up an 'adultery' (관통하는, 貫通- [gwantonghaneun, going-through]) > 간통하는, 姦通- [gantonghaneun, adulterous]) motorway.

See also
Dialectology

References

External links
The characteristics of the North Gyeongsang Dialect (Korean)

Korean dialects
Korean language in South Korea
Languages of South Korea
Culture of North Gyeongsang Province
Culture of South Gyeongsang Province
Tonal languages